Asperlicin is a mycotoxin, derived from the fungus Aspergillus alliaceus. It acts as a selective antagonist for the cholecystokinin receptor CCKA, and has been used as a lead compound for the development of a number of novel CCKA antagonists with potential clinical applications. He et al. 1998 present a synthesis from aryl iodide and vinyl iodide.

References

Mycotoxins
Cholecystokinin antagonists
Lactams